Abderremane (–1842), also known as Ramanetaka-Rivo, was king (sultan) of Mohéli in Comoros from 1830 until his death.

Life
His parents were Merina of Madagascar. His birth name was Ramanetaka-Rivo, he was a general from Madagascar, and was brother-in-law to Radama I, King of Madagascar. He died in 1842 and his daughter, Djoumbé Fatima ascended to the throne. His widow, Ravao, ruled as regent for a time and married his former adviser, Tsivandini, in 1843.

References

Bibliography
 Ibrahime, Mahmoud: Djoumbé Fatima: Une reine comorienne face aux visées coloniales de la marine française. Tarehi - Revue d'Histoire et d'Archéologie 2, 10–17, 2001.
 Grosdidier, Christophe: Djoumbe Fatima, reine de Mohéli, L'Harmattan, Paris, 2004.

External links

1842 deaths
Malagasy emigrants to the Comoros
Merina people
Sultans of Mohéli
History of the Comoros